The men's hammer throw event at the 1973 Summer Universiade was held at the Central Lenin Stadium in Moscow on 20 August.

Results

References

Athletics at the 1973 Summer Universiade
1973